Annegialia is a genus of aphodiine dung beetles in the family Scarabaeidae containing one described species, A. ataeniformis.

References

Further reading

 
 
 

Monotypic Scarabaeidae genera
Articles created by Qbugbot